Selbourne may refer to:

People

 David Selbourne, British political commentator
 Raphael Selbourne, British author

Places

 Selbourne, Tasmania

See also

 Selborne